The General Electric GEnx ("General Electric Next-generation") is an advanced dual rotor, axial flow, high-bypass turbofan jet engine in production by GE Aviation for the Boeing 787 and 747-8. The GEnx is intended to succeed the CF6 in GE's product line.

Development

The GEnx and the Rolls-Royce Trent 1000 were selected by Boeing following a run-off between the three big engine manufacturers. The GEnx uses some technology from the GE90 turbofan, including swept composite fan blades and the 10-stage HPC featured in earlier variants of the engine. The engine carries composite technology into the fan case.

The engine market for the 787 is estimated at US$40 billion over the next 25 years. A first is the elimination of bleed air systems using high temperature/high pressure air from the propulsion engines to power aircraft systems such as the starting, air-conditioning and anti-ice systems. Both engines enable the move towards the More Electric Aircraft, that is, the concept of replacing previously hydraulic and pneumatic systems with electrical ones to reduce weight, increase efficiency, and reduce maintenance requirements.

Boeing predicts reduced fuel consumption of up to 20% and significantly quieter engines than current turbofans. A  thrust version (GEnx-2B67) will be used on the 747-8. Unlike the initial version for the 787, this version has a traditional bleed air system to power internal pneumatic and ventilation systems. It will also have a smaller overall diameter than the initial model to accommodate installation on the 747.

General Electric began initial test runs of the bleedless GEnx variant on 19 March 2006. The first flight with one of these engines took place on 22 February 2007, using a Boeing 747-100, fitted with one GEnx engine in the number 2 (inboard left hand side) position.

By Fall 2019, General Electric was offering the GEnx-2B, developed for the 747-8, for the revised 767-XF variant based on the 767-400ER, but needed enough volume to cover the new product certification.

Operational history
Introduced in late 2011 on a 747-8 freighter, Cargolux surpassed one million flight hours in early 2017.

On July 28, 2012, the NTSB initiated an investigation of an engine failure that occurred on a Boeing 787 during a pre-delivery taxi test in Charleston, South Carolina.

On August 31, 2012, a GEnx-1B engine installed on a Boeing 787 that had not yet flown was found to have an indication of a similar crack on the fan midshaft. The fan midshaft was removed from the engine for further inspection and examination. As a result of investigative work the NTSB has determined that the fan midshafts on the GEnx engines fractured or cracked at the forward end of the shaft where the retaining nut is installed.

On September 11, 2012, an AirBridgeCargo 747-8F experienced a major engine malfunction that spread a significant amount of metallic debris on the runway when the low-pressure turbine shaft separated and shifted backwards, damaging the low pressure turbine blades and vanes. The NTSB issued urgent safety recommendations to the FAA to require ultrasonic scans for midshaft fractures before use of GEnx engines and require repetitive on-wing inspections of the engine to detect cracks.

The pilots were able to land the plane safely but the engines were found to have sustained damage. Among the possible factors cited was "'unique convective weather systems' such as unusually large thunderstorms reaching high altitudes." Boeing is working with GE on software solutions to the problem. Altitude was restricted until GE changed the software to detect the high-altitude ice crystals and open bleed air valve doors to eject them before they enter the core.

In March 2014, a GEnx-powered Boeing 787 had its first in-flight shut down in operation when a JAL flight had to divert to Honolulu after an oil pressure alert, bringing its in-flight shut down rate to 1 per ,000 hours.
In January 2016 a Japan Airlines 787 had an inflight shutdown after flying through icing conditions, caused by ice formed on fan blades and ingested: the blades moved forward slightly and rubbed on the abradable seal in the casing.  In March 2016, the US FAA ordered emergency fixes on the GEnx-1B PIP2. The airworthiness directive affects 43 Boeing 787 Dreamliners in the US. Abradable material in the casing in front of the fan blades was ground to keep them from rubbing when ingesting ice or debris on 330 GEnx PIP-2.

In early 2018, of 1277 orders for the B787, 681 selected the GEnx (%), 420 the Rolls-Royce Trent 1000 (%) and 176 were undecided (%).
The 2,000th GEnx was delivered by November 2019, 15 years after the engine launch, as it logged 4.5 million flight cycles and 26 million hours among 60 operators.

Design

To reduce weight, it features 18 composite fan blades, a composite fan case and titanium aluminide stage 6 and 7 low-pressure turbine blades.
Fuel efficiency is improved by 15% compared to the CF6, the bypass ratio reaches up to 9.0:1 and the overall pressure ratio up to 58.1:1.
It has a 10 stage high-pressure compressor and is quieter, helped by larger, more efficient fan blades.

It stays on wing 20% longer, uses 30% fewer parts to lower maintenance costs and has a contra-rotating architecture.
The Lean  combustor reduces NOx gases with required pressure loss and backflow margin.

Fan blades have steel alloy leading edges and the composite fan case reduces thermal expansion.
To reduce fuel burn, the 23:1 pressure ratio high-pressure compressor is based on the GE90-94B, shrouded guide vanes reduce secondary flows and counter-rotating spools for the reaction turbines reduce load on guide vanes.

To reduce maintenance cost and increase engine life, spools with lower parts count are achieved by using blisks in some stages, low blade counts in other stages and by using fewer stages; internal engine temperatures are reduced due to more efficient cooling techniques and debris extraction within the low-pressure compressor protects the high-pressure compressor.

Applications
 Boeing 747-8
 Boeing 787 Dreamliner

Variants

Specifications

See also

References

External links

 
 
 

High-bypass turbofan engines
GEnx
2000s turbofan engines